Maniwaki/Blue Sea Lake Water Aerodrome  was located  south of Maniwaki, Quebec, Canada.

See also
 Maniwaki Airport

References

Defunct seaplane bases in Quebec